Sina Tayefi (born 19 June 1997), known professionally as LE SINNER, is a Swedish singer, songwriter and rapper residing in Malmö, Sweden.

In 2017, LE SINNER rose to global fame with his debut single "Paris" after peaking #1 on Spotify's Viral 50 in USA and co-signs by the likes of DJ Snake.

Early life 
Tayefi studied fashion design at Drottning Blankas Gymnasium in Malmö, Sweden. During high school, Tayefi frequented a recreational youth center with a recording studio in Malmö. After having expressed an interest to make music, the youth center worker introduced LE SINNER to Swedish hip hop mogul Rebstar.

Career 
In December 2016, Tayefi signed a record deal with Rebstar's record label Today Is Vintage. His debut single "Paris" was released on January 13, 2017. Two weeks after its release, "Paris" peaked #1 on Spotify Viral 50 Charts in USA and #21 on the equivalent Global Chart. "Paris" accumulated over 4 million streams and has been certified Gold in Sweden. At the time, very little was known of the rising newcomer who had abstained from doing press.

In May 2017, Tayefi graced the cover story of Swedish newspaper Sydsvenskan for his first exclusive interview. On May 27, 2017, Vibe premiered Rebstar's single "Hello Kitty" featuring LE SINNER.

On June 30, 2017, LE SINNER followed up with his second single "Long Long Time".

On October 20, LE SINNER released his third single "Bad Habit" and announced his first album is on the way.

On November 17, LE SINNER released his EP A Perfect Murder.

Discography

Albums 
A Perfect Murder (2017)

Singles 
 "Paris" (2017)
 "Long Long Time" (2017)
 "Bad Habit" feat. salute (2017)
 "I Was" (2017)

Collaborations 

 "Hello Kitty" by Rebstar feat. LE SINNER (2017)
 "Unreal" by GZ feat. LE SINNER (2017)

Notes 

1997 births
Living people
Swedish hip hop musicians
Swedish people of Iranian descent
Swedish rappers
Musicians from Malmö
English-language singers from Sweden
21st-century Swedish singers
Swedish songwriters